The 2020 Canoe Slalom World Cup was a series of multiple races in several canoeing and kayaking categories organized by the International Canoe Federation (ICF). It was the 33rd edition.

Only 2 out of the 5 rounds were held due to the COVID-19 pandemic and no overall winners were declared by the ICF.

Calendar 

The series was originally scheduled to start in Ivrea, Italy, but all of the races were either canceled or postponed.

Results

World Cup Race 1 

16-18 October in Tacen, Slovenia. The races were contested by a depleted start list with several of the leading nations not participating.

World Cup Race 2 

6-8 November in Pau, France. Once again the races were contested by a depleted start list with several of the leading nations not participating.

References

External links 
 International Canoe Federation

Canoe Slalom World Cup
Canoe Slalom World Cup